The 1972 Chattanooga Moccasins football team was an American football team that represented the University of Tennessee at Chattanooga during the 1972 NCAA College Division football season. In their fifth year under head coach Harold Wilkes, the team compiled a 2–9 record.

Schedule

References

Chattanooga
Chattanooga Mocs football seasons
Chattanooga Moccasins football